Frostbite is a 2005 American direct-to-video film. It features Suzanne Stokes and Buffy Tyler and the Hawaiian girls.

Plot summary
In Mammoth Mountain, a group of misfit slackers battle a group of egotistical snobs for snowboarding rights to a ski mountain.

Cast
Peter Jason as Colonel Jaffe
Traci Lords as Naomi Bucks
Adam Grimes as Billy Wagstaff
Phil Morris as J.P. Millhouse

External links

2005 direct-to-video films
2005 films
American direct-to-video films
20th Century Fox direct-to-video films
Films set in California
Snowboarding
2005 comedy films
2000s English-language films